The Fiumicello is a river in the Italian peninsula. It rises in San Marino, flowing east to the Italian border. It is a left tributary of the Marano.

Rivers of San Marino
Rivers of Emilia-Romagna
Rivers of the Province of Rimini
International rivers of Europe
Rivers of Italy
Adriatic Italian coast basins